The 2014 European Junior and U23 Canoe Slalom Championships took place in Skopje, Macedonia from 3 to 6 July 2014 under the auspices of the European Canoe Association (ECA). It was the 16th edition of the competition for Juniors (U18) and the 12th edition for the Under 23 category. A total of 20 medal events took place.

Medal summary

Men

Canoe

Junior

U23

Kayak

Junior

U23

Women

Canoe

Junior

U23

Kayak

Junior

U23

Medal table

References

External links
European Canoe Association

European Junior and U23 Canoe Slalom Championships
European Junior and U23 Canoe Slalom Championships